Anatoma agulhasensis is a species of minute sea snail, a marine gastropod mollusk or micromollusk in the family Anatomidae.

Description
The length of the shell reaches 3 mm.

Distribution
This marine species occurs off South Africa from the Cape Province to Zululand; off Australia.

References

 Herbert, D.G., 1986. A revision of the southern African Scissurellidae (Mollusca: Gastropoda: Prosobranchia). Ann. Natal Mus., 27(2):601-632.
 Jansen, P., 1999, The Australian Scissurellidae. Conchiglia, 31(291):47-55.

External links
 To Encyclopedia of Life
 To USNM Invertebrate Zoology Mollusca Collection
 To World Register of Marine Species
 

Anatomidae
Gastropods described in 1925